Sarah Winnemucca is a bronze sculpture depicting the Northern Paiute author, activist and educator by Benjamin Victor, installed in the United States Capitol Visitor Center's Emancipation Hall, in Washington, D.C., as part of the National Statuary Hall Collection. The statue was gifted by the U.S. state of Nevada in 2005.

See also

 2005 in art

References

External links
 

2005 establishments in Washington, D.C.
2005 sculptures
Bronze sculptures in Washington, D.C.
Monuments and memorials in Washington, D.C.
Monuments and memorials to women
Winnemucca, Sarah
Sculptures of Native Americans in Washington, D.C.
Sculptures of women in Washington, D.C.
Winnemucca, Sarah